The Tanga Islands are an island group in Papua New Guinea, located north-east of New Ireland and part of the Bismarck Archipelago. Tanga is made up of four main islands — Boang, Maledok, Lif and Tefa — and a number of smaller, uninhabited islands. Boang (ca. 27 km2) consists entirely of a raised, relatively flat-topped plateau of Pleistocene, coralline limestone, which rises up to 170 m above sea level (asl.) and has sheer cliffs around a large part of its perimeter. The islands are the remnants of a stratovolcano which collapsed to form a caldera.  Lif (283 m), Tefa (155 m), and Malendok (472 m) islands are on the caldera rim, while Bitlik and Bitbok islands are lava domes constructed near the center of the caldera.

They are inhabited by the Tanga people. Former Prime Minister of Papua New Guinea Sir Julius Chan and Sumsuma, the leader of the Rabaul Strike of 1929 and Papua New Guinea's First Unionist are from the Tanga Islands.

Secret Societies practiced on the Islands are Sokapana, Tubuan and Ingiet. Mask dances include Lor, Tedak and Kipong are performed during cultural occasions.

References 
 
F. L. S. Bell Sokapana: A Melanesian Secret Society The Journal of the Royal Anthropological Institute Vol. 65'' (Jul. - Dec., 1935), pp. 311–341    
Foster, Robert J. 1995, Social Reproduction and History in Melanesia: Mortuary Ritual, Gift Exchange and Custom in the Tanga Islands.  Cambridge: Cambridge University Press.
Holding, A. 2000. Anatomy of Context: Issues in Understanding of Tangan Views of Illness, Unpublished PhD thesis,Darwin College, University of Cambridge, Cambridge.
 Garling, Stephanie J 2007 Post-Lapita Evolutions or Revolutions?Interaction and Exchange in Island Melanesia:The View from the Tanga Islands Canberra: Australian National University.

Archipelagoes of Papua New Guinea
Bismarck Archipelago
New Ireland Province
Stratovolcanoes of Papua New Guinea
Calderas of Papua New Guinea